The Khanty-Mansiysk constituency (No.222) is a Russian legislative constituency in the Khanty-Mansi Autonomous Okrug. The constituency covers okrug's capital Khanty-Mansiysk as well as western part of the region.

Members elected

Election results

1993

|-
! colspan=2 style="background-color:#E9E9E9;text-align:left;vertical-align:top;" |Candidate
! style="background-color:#E9E9E9;text-align:left;vertical-align:top;" |Party
! style="background-color:#E9E9E9;text-align:right;" |Votes
! style="background-color:#E9E9E9;text-align:right;" |%
|-
|style="background-color:#0085BE"|
|align=left|Yeremey Aypin
|align=left|Choice of Russia
|
|26.80%
|-
|style="background-color:"|
|align=left|Aleksey Stasenko
|align=left|Independent
| -
|18.70%
|-
| colspan="5" style="background-color:#E9E9E9;"|
|- style="font-weight:bold"
| colspan="3" style="text-align:left;" | Total
| 
| 100%
|-
| colspan="5" style="background-color:#E9E9E9;"|
|- style="font-weight:bold"
| colspan="4" |Source:
|
|}

1995

|-
! colspan=2 style="background-color:#E9E9E9;text-align:left;vertical-align:top;" |Candidate
! style="background-color:#E9E9E9;text-align:left;vertical-align:top;" |Party
! style="background-color:#E9E9E9;text-align:right;" |Votes
! style="background-color:#E9E9E9;text-align:right;" |%
|-
|style="background-color:"|
|align=left|Aleksandr Lotorev
|align=left|Independent
|
|26.80%
|-
|style="background-color:"|
|align=left|Vladimir Petukhov
|align=left|Independent
|
|25.51%
|-
|style="background-color:"|
|align=left|Pyotr Volostrigov
|align=left|Independent
|
|19.39%
|-
|style="background-color:"|
|align=left|Aleksandr Melnik
|align=left|Independent
|
|5.21%
|-
|style="background-color:#000000"|
|colspan=2 |against all
|
|20.49%
|-
| colspan="5" style="background-color:#E9E9E9;"|
|- style="font-weight:bold"
| colspan="3" style="text-align:left;" | Total
| 
| 100%
|-
| colspan="5" style="background-color:#E9E9E9;"|
|- style="font-weight:bold"
| colspan="4" |Source:
|
|}

1999

|-
! colspan=2 style="background-color:#E9E9E9;text-align:left;vertical-align:top;" |Candidate
! style="background-color:#E9E9E9;text-align:left;vertical-align:top;" |Party
! style="background-color:#E9E9E9;text-align:right;" |Votes
! style="background-color:#E9E9E9;text-align:right;" |%
|-
|style="background-color:"|
|align=left|Aleksandr Lotorev (incumbent)
|align=left|Independent
|
|33.52%
|-
|style="background-color:"|
|align=left|Boris Nuriyev
|align=left|Independent
|
|19.60%
|-
|style="background-color:"|
|align=left|Lidiya Anaykina
|align=left|Independent
|
|18.18%
|-
|style="background-color:"|
|align=left|Aleksandr Igumnov
|align=left|Independent
|
|9.61%
|-
|style="background-color:"|
|align=left|Leonid Aseyev
|align=left|Our Home – Russia
|
|7.26%
|-
|style="background-color:#000000"|
|colspan=2 |against all
|
|10.58%
|-
| colspan="5" style="background-color:#E9E9E9;"|
|- style="font-weight:bold"
| colspan="3" style="text-align:left;" | Total
| 
| 100%
|-
| colspan="5" style="background-color:#E9E9E9;"|
|- style="font-weight:bold"
| colspan="4" |Source:
|
|}

2002

|-
! colspan=2 style="background-color:#E9E9E9;text-align:left;vertical-align:top;" |Candidate
! style="background-color:#E9E9E9;text-align:left;vertical-align:top;" |Party
! style="background-color:#E9E9E9;text-align:right;" |Votes
! style="background-color:#E9E9E9;text-align:right;" |%
|-
|style="background-color:"|
|align=left|Aleksandr Safonov
|align=left|Independent
|
|54.59%
|-
|style="background-color:"|
|align=left|Lidiya Anaykina
|align=left|Independent
|
|27.15%
|-
|style="background-color:"|
|align=left|Valery Katukov
|align=left|Independent
|
|2.43%
|-
|style="background-color:#000000"|
|colspan=2 |against all
|
|13.63%
|-
| colspan="5" style="background-color:#E9E9E9;"|
|- style="font-weight:bold"
| colspan="3" style="text-align:left;" | Total
| 
| 100%
|-
| colspan="5" style="background-color:#E9E9E9;"|
|- style="font-weight:bold"
| colspan="4" |Source:
|
|}

2003

|-
! colspan=2 style="background-color:#E9E9E9;text-align:left;vertical-align:top;" |Candidate
! style="background-color:#E9E9E9;text-align:left;vertical-align:top;" |Party
! style="background-color:#E9E9E9;text-align:right;" |Votes
! style="background-color:#E9E9E9;text-align:right;" |%
|-
|style="background-color:"|
|align=left|Aleksandr Sarychev
|align=left|United Russia
|
|50.32%
|-
|style="background-color:#164C8C"|
|align=left|Lidiya Rusanova
|align=left|United Russian Party Rus'
|
|8.37%
|-
|style="background-color:"|
|align=left|Viktor Kononov
|align=left|Communist Party
|
|6.40%
|-
|style="background-color:"|
|align=left|Vladimir Smolin
|align=left|Liberal Democratic Party
|
|5.86%
|-
|style="background-color:"|
|align=left|Yaroslav Alitdinov
|align=left|Independent
|
|4.22%
|-
|style="background-color:#1042A5"|
|align=left|Vadim Pimkin
|align=left|Union of Right Forces
|
|2.90%
|-
|style="background-color:#7C73CC"|
|align=left|Rashid Bidyamshin
|align=left|Great Russia–Eurasian Union
|
|1.45%
|-
|style="background-color:#000000"|
|colspan=2 |against all
|
|19.27%
|-
| colspan="5" style="background-color:#E9E9E9;"|
|- style="font-weight:bold"
| colspan="3" style="text-align:left;" | Total
| 
| 100%
|-
| colspan="5" style="background-color:#E9E9E9;"|
|- style="font-weight:bold"
| colspan="4" |Source:
|
|}

2016

|-
! colspan=2 style="background-color:#E9E9E9;text-align:left;vertical-align:top;" |Candidate
! style="background-color:#E9E9E9;text-align:leftt;vertical-align:top;" |Party
! style="background-color:#E9E9E9;text-align:right;" |Votes
! style="background-color:#E9E9E9;text-align:right;" |%
|-
|style="background-color:"|
|align=left|Pavel Zavalny
|align=left|United Russia
|
|45.86%
|-
|style="background-color:"|
|align=left|Yevgeny Markov
|align=left|Liberal Democratic Party
|
|17.60%
|-
|style="background-color:"|
|align=left|Aleksey Savintsev
|align=left|Communist Party
|
|7.67%
|-
|style="background:"| 
|align=left|Anatoly Vats
|align=left|A Just Russia
|
|6.37%
|-
|style="background-color: " |
|align=left|Tatyana Irduganova
|align=left|Communists of Russia
|
|6.01%
|-
|style="background-color:"|
|align=left|Garry Stolyarov
|align=left|Party of Growth
|
|3.92%
|-
|style="background-color:"|
|align=left|Aleksandr Lomakin
|align=left|Patriots of Russia
|
|3.46%
|-
|style="background-color:"|
|align=left|Oleg Rovin
|align=left|The Greens
|
|1.85%
|-
| colspan="5" style="background-color:#E9E9E9;"|
|- style="font-weight:bold"
| colspan="3" style="text-align:left;" | Total
| 
| 100%
|-
| colspan="5" style="background-color:#E9E9E9;"|
|- style="font-weight:bold"
| colspan="4" |Source:
|
|}

2021

|-
! colspan=2 style="background-color:#E9E9E9;text-align:left;vertical-align:top;" |Candidate
! style="background-color:#E9E9E9;text-align:left;vertical-align:top;" |Party
! style="background-color:#E9E9E9;text-align:right;" |Votes
! style="background-color:#E9E9E9;text-align:right;" |%
|-
|style="background-color:"|
|align=left|Pavel Zavalny (incumbent)
|align=left|United Russia
|
|44.74%
|-
|style="background-color:"|
|align=left|Aleksey Savintsev
|align=left|Communist Party
|
|11.14%
|-
|style="background-color:"|
|align=left|Vitaly Chistov
|align=left|Liberal Democratic Party
|
|9.30%
|-
|style="background-color: " |
|align=left|Aleksandr Klishin
|align=left|A Just Russia — For Truth
|
|8.05%
|-
|style="background-color: " |
|align=left|Maksim Logachev
|align=left|Communists of Russia
|
|7.51%
|-
|style="background-color:"|
|align=left|Aleksandr Lomakin
|align=left|Party of Pensioners
|
|6.51%
|-
|style="background-color:"|
|align=left|Natalya Stankina
|align=left|Civic Platform
|
|3.90%
|-
|style="background-color:"|
|align=left|Ivan Menshenin
|align=left|Yabloko
|
|2.13%
|-
| colspan="5" style="background-color:#E9E9E9;"|
|- style="font-weight:bold"
| colspan="3" style="text-align:left;" | Total
| 
| 100%
|-
| colspan="5" style="background-color:#E9E9E9;"|
|- style="font-weight:bold"
| colspan="4" |Source:
|
|}

Notes

References

Russian legislative constituencies
Politics of Khanty-Mansi Autonomous Okrug